Coptosia brunnerae is a species of beetle in the family Cerambycidae. It was described by Sama in 2000. It is known from Jordan.

References

Saperdini
Beetles described in 2000